A camarilla is a group of courtiers or favourites who surround a king or ruler.

Camarilla may also refer to:

 Camarilla, a fictional sect from the Vampire: The Masquerade books and role-playing games
 Camarilla, a 2003 play by Van Badham

See also

Camarillo (disambiguation)
Camarillas, a municipality in Teruel, Aragon, Spain
Camarillas Formation, a geological formation in Teruel and La Rioja
Camarillasaurus, a dinosaur
 Camarilla obliqua, or Allium obliquum, a Eurasian species of wild onion